In Cape Town, Strand may refer to:
 Strand Street (Cape Town), a street in central Cape Town.
 Strand, Western Cape, a town southeast of Cape Town.